Shaikh Alauddin Chisti (1570–1613; known as Islam Khan Chisti) was a Mughal general and the Subahdar of Bengal. He transferred the capital of Bengal from Rajmahal to Dhaka and renamed it Jahangirnagar. He was awarded the titular name of Islam Khan by Mughal emperor Jahangir.

Early life
Islam Khan was a playmate of Jahangir in childhood. Khan and Jahangir were foster cousins; Khan's paternal aunt, whose father was Salim Chisti, had been the foster mother of Jahangir. Qutubuddin Koka was Khan's first cousin also. He was first appointed as the Subahdar of Bihar.

Subahdar of Bengal

Islam Khan was appointed the Subahdar of Bengal in 1608. His major task was to subdue the rebellious Rajas, Bara-Bhuiyans, Zamindars and Afghan chiefs. He arrived Dhaka in mid-1610.

He fought with Musa Khan, the leader of Bara-Bhuiyans and by the end of 1611 he was subdued. Islam Khan also defeated Raja Pratapaditya of Jessore, Raja Ramchandra Basu of the Chandradwip Kingdom at the Conquest of Bakla and Raja Ananta Manikya of Bhulua. Then he annexed the kingdoms of Koch Bihar, Koch Hajo and Kachhar. Thus he took total control over Bengal. He moved the capital of Bengal to Dhaka from Rajmahal. He renamed Dhaka to Jahangirnagar.

Death
After 5 years of ruling, Islam Khan died at Bhawal in 1613. He was buried in Fatehpur Sikri and laid by the side of his grandfather Shaikh Salim Chishti.

Shaikh Alauddin Chisti's tomb in Ajmer, known as the Dargah Sharif, has become a major pilgrimage site for people of all faiths. Every year, thousands of devotees from all over the world visit the shrine to pay their respects to the great Sufi saint and seek his blessings.

See also
 Dhaka
 History of Dhaka
 Mughal Empire
 History of Bengal

References

Further reading
 Sir Jadunath Sarkar, History of Bengal, II (Dhaka, 1948)
 Abdul Karim, History of Bengal, Mughal Period, I, (Rajshahi, 1992)

External links
 Islam Khan's Mosque

History of Dhaka
Mughal generals
1570 births
1613 deaths
People from Agra
Subahdars of Bengal
Subahdars of Bihar
16th-century Indian Muslims
16th-century Indian politicians
17th-century Indian politicians
Chishtis
Mughal Subahdars